Buffalo High School is located off of Main Street in Buffalo, Missouri, United States, and is part of the Dallas R-I County School District.

Notable alumni
 Miranda Maverick, fighter in the flyweight division of the UFC

References

High schools in Dallas County, Missouri
Public high schools in Missouri